On the Sentimental Side was intended to be a long-playing vinyl album and it was recorded in June 1962 by Bing Crosby for his own company, Project Records at United Recording, Hollywood. The album is in a “sing-along” style and Crosby over-dubbed his vocals on accompaniment recorded by the Ivor Raymonde Orchestra and chorus in London in March 1962.  The original sessions were produced by Simon Rady for Project Records.

Compositing commenced on July 31, 1962 and was never completed. Robert S. Bader of Bing Crosby Enterprises completed the compositing and mixing in January 2010. The album was issued for the first time by Collectors' Choice Music on CD No. CCM2106.

Track listing

†=chorus and orchestra only

References 

2010 albums
Bing Crosby albums
Collectors' Choice Music albums